The Skokomish (pronounced ) are one of nine tribes of the Twana, a Native American people of western Washington state in the United States. The tribe lives along Hood Canal, a fjord-like inlet on the west side of the Kitsap Peninsula and the Puget Sound basin.  Historically the Twana were hunters, fishers, and gatherers who had a nomadic lifestyle during the warmer months, while living in more permanent homes during the winter months.

Today, Skokomish people are enrolled in the federally recognized Skokomish Indian Tribe.

Like many Northwest Coast indigenous peoples, the Skokomish rely heavily on fishing for their survival.

Name
The name "Skokomish" comes from the Twana sqʷuqʷóbəš, also spelled sqWuqWu'b3sH, and meaning "river people" or "people of the river". The Skokomish were one of the largest of the nine different Twana village communities that existed before about 1860. By their locations, the nine groups were the Dabop, Quilcene ("salt-water people"), Dosewallips, Duckabush, Hoodsport, Skokomish (Skoko'bsh), Ctqwəlqweli ("Vance Creek"), Tahuya, and Duhlelap (Tule'lalap) communities. Within these nine communities there were at least 33 settlements.

Language

The Skokomish, or Twana language belongs to the Coast Salish family of indigenous languages.

Reservation
The tribe moved onto the Skokomish Indian Reservation in the central part of modern-day Mason County, Washington near the Olympic Peninsula around 1855. The reservation has a land area of 21.244 km² (8.2022 sq mi) and a 2000 census resident population of 730 persons. Its major community is Skokomish.  The nearest outside communities are Union, to its east, and Hoodsport, to its north.

Notes

References
Skokomish Reservation, Washington United States Census Bureau

External links

 Skokomish Tribal Nation, official website

Coast Salish
Culture of the Puget Sound region
Native American tribes in Washington (state)